Financial domination (also known as findom) is a variant of femdom.

Constellations 
In this fetish lifestyle, in particular a practice of dominance and submission, a submissive (cash piggy, finsub, human ATM, money slave or paypig) gives gifts and money to a financial dominant (findomme/findom, Goddess, money domme, money mistress or cashmaster). The dominant person can be female or male while the submissive is almost always male. Financial domination will also have been practiced before in individual cases, but it only became more widespread and took on its current form after the introduction of the Internet. The relationship between the two parties (including paying) often takes place solely via online communication. Moneydommes present themselves on their own websites, relevant web portals or social networks.

In the majority of cases the two never meet as findom is primarily a form of "distance domination". In rare exceptions, the submissive may accompany the dominant while shopping and paying with the submissive's money. Financial domination is often combined with other Femdom practices. Such a relationship between individuals may be similar to, yet clearly distinguishable from, relationships based on total power exchange. In the latter, the submissive may grant all their money saved and earned to the dominant, in addition to many other aspects of their autonomy; however, it is not uncommon for both partners to have an intimate relationship as well, which is contrary to the financial domination dynamic. Financial domination can also be distinguished from sugar baby relationships in which a sugar daddy/mama offers gifts and money to the "baby" in return for a relationship, generally without any explicit elements of domination. In financial domination, the submissive has no expectation of sexual contact in return for the money, and often there is no physical contact of any kind between the two parties.

It is often said that the money slave has to limit himself to the subsistence level and has no right to get anything in return. Besides the paying, it is crucial that the dominant part humiliates the submissive and shows him his supposed inferiority. Some members of the Findom scene claim that women are the superior sex. Accordingly, they demand the introduction of Matriarchy and, in some cases, legal discrimination against men. However, it remains unclear whether these are serious political demands or just fetish fantasies.

Reception 
Since 2013, numerous articles about financial domination have appeared in popular print media and online magazines. Some of them are just reports, the authors of the others subject the phenomenon to a critical examination. Some of these authors question whether financial domination is actually a sexual preference. The majority of money slaves have low self esteem and are insecure in dealing with women. Also, the first contact with a moneydomme comes about purely by chance, for example when surfing on BDSM sites or when looking for financial services (by using search terms as financial or money). Over time,  paying becomes an addiction for many,  which in the worst case can lead to financial ruin. This in turn has three reasons. First, the ready availability of financial domination over the Internet. Second, the targeted manipulation by the ladies. Many of them are not aware of their great responsibility. Thirdly, the fact that psychological dependence is wanted by both sides and is even essential for financial domination.

Other authors do not consider money slavery to be pathological and see it as an inclination that one can live out responsibly.  However, some point to the high risk of deception and fraud. With many Moneydomme accounts (for example on Twitter) it is unclear who is really behind it. There are proven cases of fraud. In addition, many women would become money mistresses for purely financial reasons, without having any relation to dominance. Both are subsumed under the term Fake in the Findom scene. However, some money slaves are said to accept the deception or even to be aroused by it.

A scientific paper about Findom was published in 2007 and 2021. For both, relevant websites and social media accounts were observed over a period of several years (see Netnography). In addition to special questions, such as self-justification and dealing with social rejection, both articles deal with the general characterization of money slavery. On the whole, the picture drawn in the popular media is confirmed and three things are also highlighted. First, the Internet has fundamentally changed the market for sexual services. Those involved could communicate more easily and, above all, anonymously, and real encounters are no longer necessary in many practices. Second, digital networks offer new (and vastly better) ways for people with dissenting inclinations or views to share, connect, and develop identities as a group. Third,  anyone can create an artificial identity on the Internet that has little to do with the real person. All three were prerequisites for the emergence of the Findom scene. For the author of the first study, this is a postmodern phenomenon, the authors of the second article compare the appearances of moneydommes with those of influencers.

See also
 Dominatrix
 Erotic hypnosis
 Erotic sexual denial

References

Fetish subculture